Sex (stylised SEX) was a boutique run by Vivienne Westwood and her then partner Malcolm McLaren at 430 King's Road, London between 1974 and 1976. It specialised in clothing that defined the look of the punk movement.

Paradise Garage
From 1969 to 1970, No. 430 was the premises of Mr Freedom.

In October 1971, Malcolm McLaren and a friend from art school, Patrick Casey, opened a stall in the back of the Paradise Garage boutique at 430 King's Road in London's Chelsea district. On sale were items collected by McLaren over the previous year, including rock & roll records, magazines, clothing and memorabilia from the 1950s.

Let It Rock
Trevor Myles (who ran Paradise Garage), relinquished the entire premises to McLaren and Casey in November 1971. They renamed the shop Let It Rock with stock including second-hand and new Teddy Boy clothes designed by McLaren's school teacher girlfriend Vivienne Westwood. The shop-front corrugated iron frontage was painted black with the name pasted in pink lettering. The interior was given period detail, such as "Odeon" wallpaper and Festival of Britain trinkets. Bespoke tailored drape jackets, skin-tight trousers and thick-soled "brothel creepers" shoes were the mainstays. Let It Rock was soon covered in the London Evening Standard.

Too Fast To Live, Too Young To Die
In 1973 the outlet interior was changed and the shop was given a new name, Too Fast To Live, Too Young To Die, to reflect a new range of clothing from Britain's early 1960s "rocker" fashions. In the spring of 1974 the shop underwent another refurbishment and was rebranded with the name Sex.

Sex
The façade included a  sign of pink foam rubber letters spelling "SEX". The interior was covered with graffiti from the SCUM Manifesto and chickenwire. Rubber curtains covered the walls and red carpeting was installed.

SEX sold fetish and bondage wear supplied by existing specialist labels such as Atomage, She-And-Me and London Leatherman as well as designs by McLaren and Westwood. Jordan (Pamela Rooke) was a sales assistant. Among customers at SEX were the four original members of Sex Pistols (the bass-player Glen Matlock was an employee as a sales assistant on Saturdays). The group's name was provided by McLaren in partial promotion of the boutique. In August 1975, nineteen-year-old John Lydon was persuaded to audition for the group by singing along to Alice Cooper's "I'm Eighteen" on the jukebox. Other notable patrons included occasional assistant Chrissie Hynde, Adam Ant, Marco Pirroni, Siouxsie Sioux, Steven Severin and the rest of the Bromley Contingent.

The store's designs confronted social and sexual taboos, and included T-shirts bearing images of the Cambridge Rapist's face hood, semi-naked cowboys from a 1969 illustration by the US artist Jim French, trompe-l'œil bare breasts by Rhode Island School of Design students Janusz and Laura Gottwald in the late 1960s, and pornographic texts from the book School for Wives ("I groaned with pain...in a soft corrosion") by the beat author Alexander Trocchi. Also featured were T-shirts with the slogan 'Prick Up Your Ears', a reference to the biography of influential proto-punk subversive Joe Orton, and text culled from the biography of Orton stating how cheap clothes suited him. Among the designs were clear plastic-pocketed jeans, zippered tops and the Anarchy shirt which used dead stock from the 1960s manufacturer Wemblex. These were bleached and dyed shirts and adorned with silk Karl Marx patches and anarchist slogans.

Seditionaries
In December 1976, 430 King's Road was renamed Seditionaries, trading under that title until September 1980. Designs were licensed by Westwood to the operators of the boutique at 153 King's Road, Boy (formerly Acme Attractions) who issued them, some with alterations, over the next eight years. Boy London was founded by Stephane Raynor and Israel-based businessman John Krivine in 1976 on the King's Road. Krivine sold the company in 1984.

World's End

In late 1980, the shop at 430 King's Road re-opened under the name World's End. The building was designed by McLaren and Westwood and realised by Roger Burton, aided by Jeremy Blackburn and Tony Devers, to resemble a mixture of the Olde Curiosity Shoppe and an 18th-century galleon. The façade was installed with a large clock which spun backwards with the floor raked at an angle. McLaren and Westwood launched the first of a series of collections from the outlet at the beginning of 1981 and collaborated for a further three years.  World's End remains open as part of Vivienne Westwood's global fashion empire.

Famous shop assistants
Many people related with the punk scene worked at the shop in one way or another. A notable employee was Jordan (Pamela Rooke), whose provocative dress sense served as a walking advertisement for the shop. At various times, Glen Matlock, Chrissie Hynde and Sid Vicious also worked there.

Further reading 
 
 
 
 The Look: Adventures in rock & pop fashion by Paul Gorman. Publisher: London, Adelita Ltd, 2006  
 England's Dreaming Sex Pistols and Punk Rock by Jon Savage. Publisher: London, Faber & Faber Ltd, 1991  
 Rotten: No Irish, No Blacks, No Dogs by John Lydon. Publisher: Picador, 1995 
 SEX & SEDITIONARIES: The incomplete sordid works of Vivienne Westwood and Malcolm McLaren" by PunkPistol. Publisher: First Edition, 2006. 
 "DESTROY by PunkPistol. Vivienne Westwood & Malcolm McLaren: The destruction and deconstruction of punk clothing" by PunkPistol. Publisher: First Edition, 2010. 

See also
World's End, Kensington and ChelseaSEX: Too Fast To Live Too Young To Die'', a compilation album of songs on their jukebox.

References

External links
Only Anarchists Are Pretty (archive.org)
Seditionaries Clothing designed by Vivienne Westwood & Malcolm McLaren c. 1976–1979. (Shockwave Flash) (archive.org)
Punk Pirate 1981 Clothing line designed by Westwood and McLaren. (archive.org)
Punk Pistol Seditionaries tribute site to clothing designed by Westwood & McLaren. (Shockwave Flash)

Clothing companies of the United Kingdom
Sex Pistols
Shops in London
Former buildings and structures in the Royal Borough of Kensington and Chelsea
Punk fashion
1974 establishments in England
1976 disestablishments in England
1970s fashion
King's Road, Chelsea, London